Ashin Abhijātābhivaṃsa (29 September 1968 – 7 February 2022), also known as Sagaing Tipiṭaka Sayadaw, was a Burmese Buddhist monk. He was chief abbot of Saddhamma Mānitāyon Monastery in Yangon and abbot of Saddhamma Jotaka Subodhāyon Monastery in Monywa. Being awarded the titles of Tipiṭakadhara and Tipiṭakakovida in 2007 and 2010 respectively, Ashin was the 12th recipient of the title of Tipiṭakadhara Dhammabhaṇḍāgārika.

Early life and education
Abhijātābhivaṃsa, the third of seven siblings, was born on 29 September 1968 (8th waxing day of Thadingyut, 1330 M.E.) in Hsinnin Village, Wetlet Township, to Tin Ya and Nyunt Khin. He was ordained as a novice on 29 November 1979 (11th waxing day of Nadaw, 1341 ME), under the presiding sayadaw of Zabumingala Shweyattha Kyaung, and sent to Mahā Subodhāyon Monastery in Sagaing on 14 December. Ashin received the titles of Sāsanālaṅkāra Thamanegyaw and Sāsanadhaja Dhammācariya since he was a novice.

Monkhood career
On 4 January 1988 (1st waning day of Pyatho, 1349 ME), Ashin was ordained as a monk under the patronage of Ashin Nārada, chief abbot of Mahā Subodhāyon.

Ashin passed all five-level 8026 recitation contents for the Tipiṭakadhara Tipiṭakakovida Selection Examinations, in which he had to show his memory of Tipiṭaka by reciting the Canon without being prompted more than five times in a day, in 2007 and was awarded the title of Tipiṭakadhara. After completing all five levels of ideology written exam, he became the holder of the title of Tipiṭakakovida, in 2010. In 2016, Ashin was offered the title of Tipiṭakadhara Dhammabhaṇḍāgārika by the Burmese government, and was thereafter known as its 12th recipient in history. In 2012, Ashin was appointed by Ashin Nandamālābhivaṃsa as presiding abbot of Saddhamma Jotaka Subodhāyon Monastery, a monastery, in Monywa, under the governance of Mahā Subodhāyon.

Ashin died of leukemia at Bumrungrad Hospital in Bangkok, on 7 February 2022, at the age of 53. During his years of monkhood, Ashin won a total of 47 achievements, including 10 Dhammācariya and 3 Pali Pāragū degrees.

References

1968 births
2022 deaths
20th-century Buddhist monks
21st-century Buddhist monks
Buddhist abbots
Burmese Buddhist monks
People from Sagaing Region
Deaths from leukemia
Deaths from cancer in Thailand